Cirencester and Tewkesbury was a parliamentary constituency in Gloucestershire which returned one Member of Parliament (MP) to the House of Commons of the Parliament of the United Kingdom.  It was created for the 1918 general election and abolished for the 1997 general election when it was partly replaced by the new constituencies of Cotswold and Tewkesbury.

History
The only party to have returned an MP for this constituency was the Conservatives, who represented it for most of the seat's existence. The exception was the period from 1951 to 1959, when William Morrison, first elected as a Conservative, became the Speaker of the House of Commons, a role in which the incumbent is traditionally unaffiliated to a party. The seat centred on the towns of Cirencester and Tewkesbury, covering much of the Cotswolds, a picturesque rolling landscape designated an Area of Outstanding Natural Beauty (AONB) in 1966. The seat was divided between the Cotswold (later renamed The Cotswolds) and Tewkesbury constituencies. Its last MP, Geoffrey Clifton-Brown, went on to represent the Cotswold constituency upon its 1997 creation. At elections contested by the major parties, Cirencester and Tewkesbury generally elected Conservatives with large majorities, and thus could usually have been classed as a safe seat for the party.

Boundaries
1918–1950: The Borough of Tewkesbury, the Urban Districts of Cirencester, Stow-on-the-Wold, and Tetbury, the Rural Districts of Campden, Cirencester, Marston Sicca, Northleach, and Pebworth, and parts of the Rural Districts of Cheltenham, Faringdon, Stow-on-the-Wold, Tetbury, Tewkesbury, and Winchcombe.

1950–1955: The Borough of Tewkesbury, the Urban District of Cirencester, and the Rural Districts of Cheltenham, Cirencester, North Cotswold, Northleach, and Tetbury.

1955–1974: The Borough of Tewkesbury, the Urban District of Cirencester, and the Rural Districts of Cheltenham, Cirencester, North Cotswold, and Northleach.

1974–1983: As prior but with redrawn boundaries.

1983–1997: The District of Cotswold wards of Ampneys, Beacon, Blockley, Bourton-on-the-Water, Campden, Churn Valley, Cirencester Abbey, Cirencester Beeches, Cirencester Chesterton, Cirencester Stratton, Cirencester Watermoor, Coln, Ermin, Evenlode Vale, Fairford, Fossehill, Fosseridge, Hampton, Kempsford, Lechlade, Mickleton, Moreton-in-Marsh, Northleach, Sandywell, Sherborne Brook, Stow-on-the-Wold, Thames Head, Three Rivers, Vale, and Water Park, and the Borough of Tewkesbury wards of Ashchurch, Bishop's Cleeve East, Bishop's Cleeve North, Bishop's Cleeve South, Cleeve Hill, Coombe Hill, Crickley, Dumbleton, Gotherington, Shurdington, Swindon, Tewkesbury Mitton, Tewkesbury Newtown, Tewkesbury Prior's Park, Tewkesbury Town, Twyning, and Winchcombe.

Members of Parliament

Elections

Election in the 1990s

Elections in the 1980s

Elections in the 1970s

Elections in the 1960s

Elections in the 1950s

Election in the 1940s

Elections in the 1930s 
General Election 1939–40:
Another General Election was required to take place before the end of 1940. The political parties had been making preparations for an election to take place and by the Autumn of 1939, the following candidates had been selected; 
Conservative: William Morrison
Popular Front: William Robert Robins

Elections in the 1920s

Election in the 1910s

See also
 List of parliamentary constituencies in Gloucestershire

References

Citations

Sources 

 F. W. S. Craig, British Parliamentary Election Results 1918-1949 (Glasgow: Political Reference Publications, 1969)

Parliamentary constituencies in South West England (historic)
Constituencies of the Parliament of the United Kingdom established in 1918
Constituencies of the Parliament of the United Kingdom disestablished in 1997
Politics of Gloucestershire